Orr's Circle of the Sciences was a scientific encyclopedia of the 1850s, published in London by William Somerville Orr.

William S Orr & Co.

William S. Orr & Co. was a publisher in Paternoster Row, London. It put out the British Cyclopædia in ten volumes of the 1830s. It also was in business selling engravings (for example the Kenny Meadows illustrations to Shakespeare), and maps, such as a mid-century Cab Fare and Guide Map of London (c. 1853).

The firm was a general commercial publisher, with a specialist area of natural history, and also published periodicals. It was innovative in its use of wood engraving, in its 1838 edition of Paul et Virginie. In children's literature, it published Christoph von Schmid's Basket of Flowers in an English translation of 1848, in partnership with J. B. Müller of Stuttgart.

William Somerville Orr
Orr himself was a publishers' agent from the 1830s, and was a close associate of Robert and William Chambers. He printed a London edition of Chambers's Edinburgh Journal by mid-1832. The arrangement used stereotype plates, and brought the circulation up to 50,000. By 1845 the circulation was declining from its peak, and Orr wrote to Chambers explaining that the market was changing. In 1846 Chambers terminated the arrangement with Orr.

Punch magazine, set up in 1841, brought in Orr to help with distribution to booksellers and news agents. Orr died in 1873.

Orr's Circle of the Sciences
Orr's Circle of the Sciences was announced first as a part publication, a series in weekly parts, price 2d. beginning 5 January 1854. The series editor was John Stevenson Bushnan, who also wrote the introductory section of the first volume.

Notes

External links
Orr's Circle of the Sciences at archive.org
Orr's Circle of the Sciences, vol II. The Mathematical Sciences. at Internet Archive

1850s books
Encyclopedias of science
Science books
19th-century encyclopedias
British encyclopedias
English-language encyclopedias